John Icha Lal (born Suva, Fiji 24 February 1933) was formerly a player, captain and coach of the Fiji national football team.

He was coach of the Fiji national football team from 1977 to 1978.

References

1933 births
Fijian people of Indian descent
Living people
Fijian footballers
Fiji international footballers
Association football forwards